G H Raisoni College of Engineering and Management (GHRCEM) is an Autonomous (B.Tech) educational institute located in Pune, India, which is affiliated to Pune University (SPPU). It offers Post-Graduate and Undergraduate degrees in the fields of computer, electronics and information technology and business administration and is part of the Raisoni Group of Institutions. It is approved by All India Council for Technical Education (AICTE).

Infrastructure 
Campus of G.H. Raisoni College of Engineering & Management, Wagholi, Pune is on Ahmednagar road, 15 km from Pune Railway station and only 4 kilometers away from the airport and Very close to the Industrial Area, the environment at the sprawling campus is conducive to academic pursuits like class-room studies and research. The ergonomic design of building helps to generate a feeling of spaciousness and tranquility, with ample scope for future development and expansion. The institute has much needed student-friendly atmosphere and the courses have a distinct advantage of approach, designed to suit the needs of aspiring employees and the Industry in the close vicinity. The Institute will establish closer links with the industries around through Training & Placement Department.

Admissions
65% of students are admitted on the basis of marks scored on the Maharashtra Engineering Entrance and 15% of the students from outside Maharashtra state by management quota admitted through the Joint Entrance Exam (JEE).

Departments:
 Civil Engineering Department
 Computer Engineering Department
 Mechanical Engineering Department
 Electronics and Telecommunications Engineering Department
 Information Technology Department
 MCA Department

Facilities
 Campus
 Canteen
 Girls Hostel
 Boys Hostel
 Library
 Gymnasium
 Transportation
 Sport
 ATM
 Health Care

See also
 Directorate of Technical Education, Maharashtra

References

External links
 
 

Engineering colleges in Pune
Engineering colleges in Maharashtra